This list compares various energies in joules (J), organized by order of magnitude.

Below 1 J

1 to 105 J

106 to 1011 J

1012 to 1017 J

1018 to 1023 J

Over 1023 J

SI multiples

See also

Conversion of units of energy
Energy conversion efficiency
Energy density
Metric system
Outline of energy
Scientific notation
TNT equivalent

Notes

Energy

Energy